Brookmill Park, formerly known as Ravensbourne Park, is a small public park and nature reserve in the London Borough of Lewisham. It runs parallel to Brookmill Road, Deptford and the River Ravensbourne. It is located between Deptford Bridge and Elverson Road on the Docklands Light Railway (DLR).

History of the park
The park began life in 1880 as a small recreation ground near the Kent Waterworks' reservoir, which supplied water to homes in Deptford and Greenwich, drawing water from the Ravensbourne. In the 1920s, part of the by then disused reservoir was infilled and added to the area, creating Brookmill Park.

Nearby housing in Brookmill Road was destroyed during World War II and cleared ground was used to enlarge the park, which re-opened in 1951 as Ravensbourne Park. In 1965, Lewisham and Deptford were amalgamated into one London borough and the park reverted to its earlier name of Brookmill.

During DLR extension to Lewisham in the 1990s, the River Ravensbourne was rerouted. Most of the park to the east of the river was used for the DLR track and the Ravensbourne's new channel became the eastern boundary of the park. The park was re-landscaped by W.S. Atkins, also incorporating a site that had belonged to Thames Water as a formal garden with ponds, pergolas and flowerbeds. The park reopened in 1998.

Layout and notable features
The park runs parallel to the River Ravensbourne  along its eastern side and Brookmill Road on the western side.

Part of the former reservoir remains as a small lake within the park – this had been drained but was reinstated after a local campaign. The lake is surrounded by mature trees, including London planes. The south of the park contains an area of native plants on disused railway embankment.

With areas of marsh, water and grassland, some of which floods at high tides, the park is considered an important nature conservation area within the borough of Lewisham. Bird species sighted at the park may include kingfisher, grey heron and moorhen.

The footpath and cycle path in the park are part of the Waterlink Way, which runs through Lewisham and Bromley. They also form part of National Cycle Route 21, which extends from the River Thames at Creekside to Eastbourne.

References

External sources
Description and maps showing location of former Kent Waterworks
Deptford Dame blog on Brookmill Park wildlife

Parks and open spaces in the London Borough of Lewisham
Deptford